St. Joe is an unincorporated community in the town of Marshfield in Fond du Lac County, Wisconsin, United States. It is considered part of the Holyland.

The first settlers came to the area from nearby Johnsburg in 1847. A Catholic parish was soon formed in the area, and mass was first held in a log cabin church in 1860. The present-day stone St. Joseph's Church was built in 1870. A creamery used to be in the area.

References

Unincorporated communities in Wisconsin
Unincorporated communities in Fond du Lac County, Wisconsin
Populated places established in 1847
1847 establishments in Wisconsin Territory